Guanghua Temple is a Buddhist temple located at 31 Ya'er Hutong, north of Shichahai in the Xicheng District of Beijing, China. Founded during the Yuan dynasty (1271–1368), it is one of Beijing's most renowned Buddhist temples.

References

Xicheng District
Buddhist temples in Beijing